Joshua Brenner Ilika was born  (September 14, 1976 in Celaya, Guanajuato) is a Mexican butterfly and freestyle swimmer, who began swimming at the age of three. He participated in the 2000 and 2004 Summer Olympics.

See also
List of Mexican records in swimming

References

External links

1976 births
Living people
Mexican male butterfly swimmers
Mexican male freestyle swimmers
Sportspeople from Guanajuato
Swimmers at the 1999 Pan American Games
Swimmers at the 2000 Summer Olympics
Swimmers at the 2003 Pan American Games
Swimmers at the 2004 Summer Olympics
Olympic swimmers of Mexico
Mexican people of German descent
People from Celaya
USC Trojans men's swimmers
Central American and Caribbean Games gold medalists for Mexico
Competitors at the 2002 Central American and Caribbean Games
Central American and Caribbean Games medalists in swimming
Pan American Games competitors for Mexico
20th-century Mexican people
21st-century Mexican people